A corn mummy is an Ancient Egyptian sculpture of Osiris that contained corn (commonly wheat or barley). The rest of the mummy was made up of other materials such as wax, sand and earth. They were fitted with masks most commonly made of wax but sometimes silver. The mummies were provided with wooden coffins.

They seem to have been buried as part of certain festivals such as Khoiak.

References

Sculptures of ancient Egypt